Graphium stratocles is a species of butterfly in the family Papilionidae. It is found in the Philippines.

Subspecies
G. s. stratocles (Philippines: Mindoro)
G. s. stratonices (Jordan, 1909) (Philippines: Bohol, Dinagat, Leyte, Mindanao, Panaon, Samar)
G. s. senectus Tsukada & Nishiyama, 1980 (Philippines: Luzon, Marinduque)
G. s. dodongi (Page & Treadaway, 2003) (Philippines: Palawan)
G. s. pingi (Page & Treadaway, 2003) (Philippines: Busuanga)

Status
Common. Not threatened.

References

Further reading
Page M. G.P & Treadaway,C. G.  2003 Schmetterlinge der Erde, Butterflies of the world Part XVII (17), Papilionidae IX Papilionidae of the Philippine Islands. Edited by Erich Bauer and Thomas Frankenbach Keltern: Goecke & Evers; Canterbury: Hillside Books. 
Page & Treadaway, 2003 Descriptions of New Subspecies and Changes in Classification in Bauer & Frankenbach,Schmetterlinge der Erde Butterflies of the world, Suppl. 8: 1-6

External links
Butterfly corner Images from Naturhistorisches Museum Wien
Graphium stratocles

stratocles
Butterflies described in 1861